Caswell Memorial State Park is a state park of California, United States, preserving a riparian forest along the Stanislaus River. It is located in southern San Joaquin County southwest of the town of Ripon. Riparian Oak Woodland, located in this park, is threatened and the park is trying to protect it. It once flourished through California's Central Valley. Caswell is also the home to several endangered species. The  park was established in 1952.

It is common to exceed  for several consecutive days in the summer. Caswell is home to many mosquitoes.

This park has been named after the landowner, Thomas Caswell. He enjoyed this beautiful forest and wanted to preserve it. In the 1950s,  of this forest were donated by his children and grandchildren to California before it was opened to the public as a state park in 1958.

See also 
 List of California state parks

References

External links
 Caswell Memorial State Park

State parks of California
Parks in San Joaquin County, California
Stanislaus River
Campgrounds in California
1952 establishments in California
Protected areas established in 1952
Parks in the San Joaquin Valley